Rockland Farm, also known as Funk Farm or Davis House, is a historic home located at Hagerstown, Washington County, Maryland, United States. It is a two-story, three-bay stone dwelling with white trim built in 1773.  Also on the property is a log outbuilding and a -story stone tenant house built over a spring.

It was listed on the National Register of Historic Places in 1978.

References

External links
, including photo from 1974, at Maryland Historical Trust

Houses on the National Register of Historic Places in Maryland
Houses in Hagerstown, Maryland
Houses completed in 1773
National Register of Historic Places in Washington County, Maryland